Sleeping Buffalo is a census-designated place (CDP) in Phillips County, Montana, United States. The Sleeping Buffalo CDP is on high ground between Nelson Reservoir to the north and the valley of Beaver Creek to the south.

The location was first listed as a CDP prior to the 2020 census.

Demographics

References 

Census-designated places in Phillips County, Montana
Census-designated places in Montana